This article shows the on air team members for the ITV Breakfast programme Daybreak which began broadcasting in the United Kingdom on 6 September 2010.

On 9 July 2010 it was announced ITV would rebrand GMTV as Daybreak. On 31 August 2010 the new presenting line-up was announced. On 5 December 2011 original presenters Christine Bleakley and Adrian Chiles were "axed" from the programme. On 11 June 2012, it was announced the programme would undergo a new look and presenting team.

On 3 March 2014 it was announced that Sean Fletcher, Charlotte Hawkins, Susanna Reid and Ben Shephard would become presenters on the new ITV Breakfast programme Good Morning Britain.

Note: In addition to the dedicated Daybreak reporters and correspondents listed below, ITV News and regional ITV journalists appeared for supporting or relief purposes

Presenters history

References

External links

ITV Breakfast